Tim Sexton is an American producer, music supervisor, environmental consultant, and social impact entrepreneur.  Noted for events and initiatives which integrate pop culture and social activism,  he produced the No Nukes, Peace Sunday, and Live 8 concerts, and was an architect of "Feel the Power," the precursor to Rock the Vote. He is the principal of the Make Good Group, a company he founded in 2003 to advise corporate clients on sustainability, social responsibility, and brand strategy.  Go Green, the environmental program Sexton designed for the Philadelphia Eagles, is considered a model of sustainability.

Sexton served as the music supervisor for dozens of films, including Madonna's Desperately Seeking Susan, and Rush, which featured Eric Clapton's Grammy Award-winning "Tears in Heaven."

Early life and education 
The oldest of 11 children, Sexton was born in Buffalo, New York to Jane Marie Sexton, an artist, and Robert Sexton, an NBA general manager and basketball coach. The family moved to San Diego in 1960 after Robert Sexton accepted a position as the athletic director at the University of San Diego.

Career
Sexton began his career in production with the Ice Follies-Holiday on Ice. He  was involved in all of the tasks related to the show’s production where he discovered an affinity for stage management and lighting design. Throughout the 1970s, he served as a lighting designer, production consultant, production manager or tour manager for dozens of stadium and arena tours for artists including America, Poco, The Rolling Stones, Jackson Browne, Diana Ross, Earth, Wind & Fire, Rufus & Chaka Khan, and many others.

Based in Los Angeles, Sexton was active in social, political, and environmental issues. In 1979, he was recruited by Rock & Roll Hall of Fame member Graham Nash to  produce No Nukes, composed of five shows at Madison Square Garden (which featured Crosby Stills and Nash, Bruce Springsteen and the E Street Band, James Taylor, Bonnie Raitt, among others) and an outdoor rally which drew more than 200,000 people on the then-empty landfill section of Battery Park.

In 1984, Sexton partnered with MTV executives including Les Garland to create the "Feel the Power" campaign for the network.  With 30 second spots featuring artists including Cyndi Lauper, Jimi Hendrix, and Tina Turner, its goal was to mobilize young voters and facilitate voter registration.  It was the foundation of Rock the Vote, for which Sexton served as a director for several years.

Based on his work on the No Nukes concerts, which were the subject of a 1980 documentary, Sexton was pursued as a music supervisor for television and film.  In 1983, he was retained by 20th Century Fox to oversee contemporary music for the studio. In 1984, he was named vice president of music at Columbia TriStar Pictures and in 1987, with Becky Mancuso-Winding, he co-founded the film music company Magstripe Entertainment.  In addition to working with Winding, he served as a music supervisor and consultant for Fox,  Disney, and producer Jerry Weintraub.  He went on to co-found Big Screen Records (with Irving Azoff's of Giant Records) and launch Track Factory (with Sidney Sheinberg).  In 2000, he was named president of Digital On-Demand/Red DotNet, which was later acquired by Alliance Entertainment.

In 2003, Sexton founded The Sexton Company, which he described in an interview with The Washington Post as a company that "helps companies do well by doing good." He began working with the Philadelphia Eagles on sustainability programs that same year. The team's Go Green initiative began with a recycling bin in every office and grew to include 100% exclusive use of renewable energy at their stadium, offices, and practice facilities. Sexton's Go Green program for the Eagles has become the benchmark in sustainability and has been emulated by the Seattle Mariners, the Atlanta Falcons, the Phoenix Suns, the Green Sports Alliance, and the Oakland As, among many others.

In 2005, Sexton executive produced  Live 8, a series of concerts designed to focus attention on debt relief and extreme poverty in Africa. More than 1000 musicians performed on a single day simultaneously at nine concerts on four continents, including  Madonna, U2, Jay Z, Pink Floyd, Kanye West, and Paul McCartney. As executive producer of Live 8, Sexton won the first-ever Emmy award for content delivered via the internet.

In 2007, he produced Idol Gives Back, then the most successful charity event in television history.  To date it has raised more than $175 million for organizations working to alleviate poverty in America and Africa, and was awarded a special Emmy by the Governors of the Television Academy.

In 2008, with his then partners, Brendan Sexton and Matt Walden, Sexton initiated a sustainability strategy and business development structure for National Grid, the second-largest energy utility company in the world.  In 2012, the Sexton Company was renamed The Make Good Group and was featured in an Entrepreneur magazine cover story as one of top 100 companies to watch. The Qualcomm Tricorder XPRIZE, a 2017 global $10 million competition for a consumer device which successfully makes medical diagnoses, was co-conceived by Sexton and wireless health pioneer Don Jones.

Philanthropy
Sexton acts an advisor to or, a director (past or present) of the Yale University’s Thorne Prize for Social Innovation in Health or Education, Rock the Vote, USC’s Center for Body Computing, Alliance for Climate Education, Medical Aid for El Salvador, EMA, Liberty Hill Foundation and he is a co-founder of Southern California's E2 (Environmental Entrepreneurs).

Filmography/Discography

References

External links
 The Make Good Group 

1949 births
Living people